FC Khartsyzk, founded under the name Hirnyk in the early 20th century, was a Ukrainian football club from Khartsyzk, Donetsk Oblast.

Honours
Ukrainian Second Division:
7th place: 1992
Ukrainian Cup:
1/64 finals: 1993/94
Ukrainian Amateur League:
3rd place in Group 4: 1994/95
Ukrainian Amateur Cup:
1/4 finals: 1996/97

References

 
Defunct football clubs in Ukraine
Football clubs in Donetsk Oblast
Association football clubs disestablished in 1997
1997 disestablishments in Ukraine